Sigismondo Betti (January 25, 1700 in Florence – after 1783 in Florence) was an Italian painter.

Betti worked mostly in Genoa and in  Liguria. He was a pupil of Antonio Puglieschi and a fresco painter Matteo Bonechi. He initially painted in Tuscany, but moved to Genoa in 1737, and a decade later to Varallo.

References

1699 births
18th-century Italian painters
Italian male painters
Painters from Florence
Year of death missing
18th-century Italian male artists